Young God or Young Gods may refer to:
 Young God Records
 Young God (EP), by Swans
 The Young Gods, a band
 Young Gods (comics), a group of superheroes in the Marvel Universe
 Young God (producer), one half of hip-hop production duo Blue Sky Black Death
"Young God", a song by Halsey from Badlands
Young Gods, 1991 album by Little Angels